Joanna M Tope (born 14 May 1944 in Bideford, Devon) is an English actress. She has appeared in many TV programmes  including Emmerdale Farm as Dr. Clare Scott between 1973 and 1977, The Omega Factor as Julia Crane in 1979 and The Tomorrow People as Mrs Boswell.

Nominated for a New York Drama Desk Award for Outstanding Solo Performance in 'The Promise' by Douglas Maxwell which was on at 59E59 Theater New York from March 29 until April 17, 2011, as part of Scotland Week. Appearing in 'Facade' with the Auricle Ensemble in August and September 2011 and currently doing radio for BBC.

After taking an Honours Degree in Drama at Manchester University, Joanna was fortunate to spend the next 10 years working in London and the provinces and in both theatre and television, in a variety of parts, allowing her to explore and stretch her versatility.
Her roles have included Ibsen's "Hedda Gabler", Adelaide in "Guys and Dolls" and the Old Woman in Edward Bond's "Bingo". She appears regularly on BBC Scotland  and has also acted on radio dramas.

At the very beginning of her career she was an ASM and played small parts at Pitlochry.  She married a Glaswegian and lives in Scotland.

She has appeared at the Citizens Theatre as Jocasta in "Oedipus The King" and as Helen in "A Taste of Honey" and as Mrs. Eynsford Hill in "Pygmalion". In 1997, she appeared at the Edinburgh Festival as Dorimene in a Scottish Opera/Nottingham Playhouse production of Strauss' "Ariadne Auf Naxos" and has made numerous concert and cabaret appearances. She was assistant director on "The Rising Generation" at Theatre Royal, Lincoln.

She has three children, Tom, John and Maggie.

Stage Credits
2011, Maggie Brodie, THE PROMISE, Random Accomplice/59E59 Theater New York, Johnny McKnight
2010, Maggie Brodie, PROMISES PROMISES, Random Accomplice, Johnny McNight
2009, Reader, 'FACADE', Auricle, Christopher Swaffer
2008, Mary Barfoot, 'REHEARSAL ROOM' READING OF 'AROUSAL', Stellar Quines Theatre Company, Linda Griffiths
2007, Various, CLASS ACT, Traverse, Jemima Levick, Lorn Campbell. John Mitchell
2006, Agnetha, FROZEN, Rapture, Michael Emans
2006, Madame de Rosemonde, LES LIAISONS DANGEREUSES, Royal Lyceum Edinburgh, John Dove
2005, Aunt Rose, BABY DOLL, Citizens Theatre, Jeremy Raison
2005, Storyteller 7 and five characters, CHRISTMAS CAROL, Royal Lyceum Theatre, Edinburgh, Jemima Levick
2005, Valda Trevlyn, THE BEST SNOW FOR SKIING, Playwrights Studio Scotland, David Ian Neville
2004, Linda Loman, DEATH OF A SALESMAN, Royal Lyceum Theatre, Edinburgh, John Dove
2004, Granny Betty, SWANSONG, Tron. Rehearsed Reading, Lucy Jameson
2004, Mother, THE UNCONQUERED. A REHEARSED READING, Stellar Quines Theatre Company, Muriel Romanes
2003, Lea de Lonval, CHERI, Citizens' Theatre Company, Philip Prowse
2003, Aquilina's Maid, VENICE PRESERVED, Citizen's Theatre, Philip Prowse
2003, E. M. Ashford, WIT, Stellar Quines Theatre Company, Gaynor Macfarlane
2000, Mrs Christie, 10 RILLINGTON PLACE, Kenny Miller
2000, Mrs Bradman, BLITHE SPIRIT, Citizens Theatre, Philip Prowse
2000, Aase/Solveig, PEER GYNT, Citizens Theatre, Clare Venables
1999, Connie/Cook, CAVALCADE, Citizens Theatre, Philip Prouse
1999, Mrs Eynsford-Hill, PYGMALION, Citizens Theatre, Philip Prouse
1997, Dorimene, LE BOURGEOIS GENTILHOMME/ARIADNE AUF NAXOS, Nottingham Playhouse Theatre, Martin Duncan*

Radio Credits
2011, Reader, RADIO 4 SHORT STORY. LIDO LOVER, BBC, Gaynor Macfarlane
2011, Various, RADIO WORKSHOP, BBC Radio drama, Kirsteen Cameron and Eilidh McCreadie
2010, Rose, LEGACY, BBC7 and Radio Scotland, David Ian Neville
2010, Mme Harnaud, SUNDAY, BBC Radio 4 Afternoon Play, Patrick Rayner
2009, Reader, A GLIMPSE OF STOCKING, BBC Radio4, Eilidh McCreadie
2009, Khatira, BLUE WATER IN HELMAND, BBC Scotland, Bruce Young
2009, Emma Fairchild, MCLEVY, BBC Radio 4, Patrick Rayner
2009, Reader, AFTERNOON STORY. THE LARK, BBC Radio 4, Kirsteen Cameron
2009, Reader, THE RAILWAY CHILDREN, BBC Radio 4, Gaynor Macfarlane
2008, Marta, WOMAN'S HOUR SERIAL. AN EXPERT IN MURDER, BBC Radio 4, Gaynor Macfarlane
2008, Reader, GET LOST. SHORT STORY, BBC Radio 4, Kirsteen Cameron
2008, Reader, BOOK OF THE WEEK. MY FATHER'S COUNTRY, BBC Radio 4, Kirsty Williams
2008, Aurora and the Cook, LAURA, BBC Radio4, Bruce Young
2008, Trolley girl and Townspeople, THE SWITCH, BBC Radio 3. The Wire, David Jackson Young
2008, Brenda, NEVER THE BRIDE, BBC7, David Jackson Young
2007, Reader, A VIEW FROM THE CARPET, BBC Radio 4, David Jackson Young
2007, Dr Hirst / Nora Hull, DOVER BEATS THE BAND, BBC Radio 4, David Ian Neville
2007, Reader, HOUSEWORK, BBC Radio 4, Kirsty Williams
2007, Reader, IMAGINE, BBC Radio 4, Kirsty Williams
2007, Vera, RESURRECTION, BBC Radio 4, Lu Kemp
2007, Queen Caroline, THE HEART OF MIDLOTHIAN, BBC Radio 4, Bruce Young
2007, Reader, THE TROUBLE WITH LICHEN, BBC 7 / 7th Dimension, Eilidh McCreadie
2006, Rachel, ISLAND BLUE, BBC Radio 4 Woman's Hour Serial, David Ian Neville
2006, Joan, KAFFIR LILIES, BBC Radio 4, Bruce Young
2006, Mrs Maxwell, KITTY ELIZABETH MUST DIE, BBC Radio 3 The Wire, Lu Kemp
2005, Noreen and Mrs Fish, DOVER AND THE CLARET TAPPERS, Radio 4, David Ian Neville
2005, Mrs Newage, THE RECEPTIONIST, Radio 4, Lu Kemp
2004, Tamara Graham, BENEDICT'S RULE, BBC Radio 4, Gaynor Macfarlane
2004, Adelheid Turkheimer, BERLIN, BBC Radio 4, David Jackson Young
2004, Beth, GHOST ZONE, BBC 7, Bruce Young
2004, Concierge, HIMMLER'S BOY, BBC Radio 3, Patrick Rayner
2004, Sybil Shade, PALE FIRE, BBC Radio 3, Patrick Rayner
2004, Reader, SHORT STORY - ONE SIZE FITS ALL, BBC Radio 4, Bruce Young
2003, Voice of the River, DART, BBC Radio 4, Gaynor Macfarlane
2003, Reader, GENESIS, BBC Radio 4, Lu Kemp
2003, Reader, THE SWIMMING LESSON, BBC Radio 4, Bruce Young
2002, Reader, THE BODY ON THE BEACH, Book At Bedtime Radio 4, David Jackson Young
2001, Sebastiana, BALTHAZAR & BLIMUNDA, Radio 3, Patrick Rayner
2001, Reader, FLOWER O'THE QUINCE, Radio 4, Julia Butt
2001, Mme Thireau, MURDER MYSTERY, BBC Radio, Bruce Young
2001, Dr Gall, ROSSUM'S CYBER CAFE, Radio 3, Dave Bachelor
2001, Psychologist, THE HAUNTING, BBC Radio, Dave Bachelor
2001, Reader, THE MONUMENT OF SHAH JAHAN, BBC Radio, Bruce Young
1999, Mrs Davilow, DANIEL DERONDA, BBC Radio Drama, Patrick Rayner
1998, Fanny Kemble, RECORD OF A GIRLHOOD, Radio Scotland, David Jackson Young
1997, Ellen Richmond, DECEIT, BBC Radio, Hamish Wilson

Other Credits
2011, Musical, Reciter, FACADE, Auricle Ensemble, Chris Swaffer
2010, Television, Mrs McWhisket, A BISCUIT FOR MRS MCWHISKET IN GRANDPA IN MY POCKET SERIES, Adastra, Mellie Bews
2010, Audio, Reader, SOMETHING BORROWED BY PAUL MAGRS, AudioGo, Sue Dalziel
2009, Audio, Reader, NEVER THE BRIDE BY PAUL MAGRS, BBC Audio Books, Sue Dalziel
2008, Rehearsed Reading, Mary Barfoot, AGE OF AROUSAL, Stellar Quines Theatre Company, Linda Griffiths
2008, Rehearsed Reading, Margaret Ann Brodie, PROMISES, PROMISES, Random Accomplice, Johnny MacNight
2004, Television, Mrs McHarg, MONARCH OF THE GLEN, BBC, Rob Knight
2003, Television, chairperson, THE KEY, Key Productions, David Blair
2000, Feature Film, Mother, GOLDFISH, A Girl Called Bill, Sam Leyton
1999, Corporate, Joyce Allen, OUT OF COURT, Crystal Media, Bernard Krichefski
1997, Feature Film, Dr Black, FRIENDLY VOICES, MTP, Jack Wyper
1996, Feature Film, Lady Langley, THE RUBY RING, Hallmark/Scottish Television, Harley Cokeliss
The Omega Factor as Julia Crane (1979)
Centre Play (Mirror, Mirror) as Emma (1976)
The Tomorrow People as Mrs. Boswell (1975)
Z-Cars as Angie Burford (1974)
Emmerdale Farm as Dr Clare Scott (1973–1977)
The Shadow of the Tower as Cicely (1972)
Menace as Clerk (1970)

References

External links

Living people
1944 births